The Howe baronetcy, of Compton in the County of Gloucester, was created in the Baronetage of England on 22 September 1660 for John Howe, Member of Parliament for Gloucestershire in 1654–1655 and 1656–1658. His elder son Richard, the second baronet, was also an MP, as was his younger son John Grobham Howe (died 1679). Sir Richard Grobham Howe, the third baronet, was MP for Tamworth, Cirencester and Wiltshire. Sir Emanuel Scrope Howe, 4th Baronet became the 2nd Viscount Howe on the death of his father in 1713 and the baronetcy which he inherited in 1730 was merged with his viscountcy.

Howe baronets, of Compton (1660)
 Sir John Howe, 1st Baronet (died c.1671)
 Sir Richard Grobham Howe, 2nd Baronet (28 August 1621 – 3 May 1703)
 Sir Richard Grobham Howe, 3rd Baronet (c. 1652 – 3 July 1730)
 Sir Emanuel Scrope Howe, 4th Baronet (c. 1700 – 29 March 1735)

The baronetcy merged with the Howe viscountcy in 1730 (see Viscount Howe). Both became extinct in 1814.

See also
 Howe baronets

Notes

Extinct baronetcies in the Baronetage of England
1660 establishments in England
1814 disestablishments in England